Jerry G. Elliott (November 25, 1936 – April 5, 2010) was a judge on the Kansas Court of Appeals.  Elliot served on this court from 1987 until his death.

Biography
Jerry Elliott was born in Fort Scott, Kansas.  He graduated with an A.B. degree from the University of Kansas in 1958.  He earned his law (LL.B.) degree from the same school in 1964.  He was an ROTC student and served active duty in the Navy.  He was married to his wife Debra Duncan and had one son.

Elliott has been president of the Wichita Council of Camp Fire, the Kansas chapter of the Leukemia Society of America, the Wichita Legal Aid Society, the Wichita Bar Association, and a board member of Music Theatre of Wichita

Legal career
After law school, Judge Elliott worked as a law clerk for Judge Wesley E. Brown of the U.S. District Court in Wichita, Kansas.  In 1966, he joined the law firm Foulston, Siefkin, Powers & Eberhardt where he focused on appellate practice and creditors' rights.

He received the Kansas Bar Association President's Outstanding Service Award in 1982 and 1995, and the Phil Lewis Medal of Distinction in 2004

Death
Jerry Elliott died in Lawrence, Kansas on April 5, 2010, after a long battle with cancer.

References

External links
 Kansas Court of Appeals website 
 Obituary

1936 births
2010 deaths
Deaths from cancer in Kansas
Kansas Court of Appeals Judges
People from Fort Scott, Kansas
University of Kansas alumni
20th-century American judges